Teves may refer to

 Continental Teves, part of Continental AG of Germany
 TVes, a Venezuelan TV station (called "Teves" in some media)
 Tensor–vector–scalar gravity ("TeVeS"), relativistic generalization of Modified Newtonian dynamics
 Tevet, a month in the Hebrew calendar